Walter Köstner (born 28 June 1936) is a German fencer. He represented the United Team of Germany in 1960 and 1964 and West Germany in 1968.

References

External links
 

1936 births
Living people
German male fencers
Olympic fencers of the United Team of Germany
Olympic fencers of West Germany
Fencers at the 1960 Summer Olympics
Fencers at the 1964 Summer Olympics
Fencers at the 1968 Summer Olympics
Sportspeople from Bayreuth
20th-century German people